Shayne Smith may refer to:

 Shayne Smith (comedian)
 Shayne Smith (footballer)

See also
 Shane Smith (disambiguation)